Whittier is an unincorporated community in Linn County, Iowa, United States. It is located at the intersections of County Roads X20 and E34 south of Waubeek and west of Viola, at 42.092976N, -91.462973W.

History
Whittier was founded as a Quaker community, and was named after Quaker poet and abolitionist John Greenleaf Whittier.  The Whittier Friends Meeting House is listed on the National Register of Historic Places.

Whittier's population was 28 in 1902, and 100 in 1940.

References

Unincorporated communities in Linn County, Iowa
Unincorporated communities in Iowa